Ērģeme is a village in Valka municipality, Latvia, and the centre of Ērģeme parish. It is the location of the ruins of Ērģeme Castle, an Ordensburg which was built in the 14th century in place of an ancient Estonian hillfort, then part of Sakala county.

Ērģeme Castle

See also
Battle of Ergeme

References 

Towns and villages in Latvia
Castles of the Teutonic Knights
Kreis Walk